Sofiane Choubani (born 29  March 1990) is a French footballer who plays for Stade Poitevin FC.

He played in the 2016 Algerian Cup Final for NA Hussein Dey.

References

External links
 Profile at Foot National (French)
 
 Profile at Eurosport
 

1990 births
Living people
French footballers
French expatriate footballers
France youth international footballers
Association football midfielders
Racing Club de France Football players
FC Nantes players
USM Bel Abbès players
NA Hussein Dey players
UJA Maccabi Paris Métropole players
JA Drancy players
Rodez AF players
Sabah F.C. (Malaysia) players
Championnat National 2 players
Championnat National 3 players
Ligue 2 players
Algerian Ligue Professionnelle 1 players
French expatriate sportspeople in Malaysia
Expatriate footballers in Malaysia
Sportspeople from Argenteuil
Footballers from Val-d'Oise